The 1932–33 Chicago Black Hawks season was the team's seventh season of play. The team failed to qualify for the playoffs.

Regular season
They were coming off a 2nd-place finish in the American Division the previous year, however, they were put out of the playoffs in the 1st round by the Toronto Maple Leafs.  The Black Hawks would start the year with a new head coach, hiring Emil Iverson, however, he was let go after the team got off to a mediocre 8–7–6 start.  Godfrey Matheson was hired as an interim coach, and after 2 losses, the Hawks would hire former Ottawa Senators head coach and general manager, Tommy Gorman.  Under Gorman, the Hawks would go 8–11–6, and finish in the cellar of the American Division, missing the playoffs for the first time since 1929.

The Black Hawks were forced to start the season at Chicago Coliseum after a disagreement between the club and the owners of Chicago Stadium, however, it was quickly resolved, and the Hawks would move back to their home in early December.

Paul Thompson would lead Chicago offensively, putting up team highs in goals (13), assists (20), and points (33).  Tom Cook would have a solid season, earning 12 goals and 26 points, while Johnny Gottselig and Doc Romnes would each get 22 points.  The team though would score an NHL low (tied with the Ottawa Senators) 88 goals.

In goal, Chuck Gardiner would have another solid season, as he had a GAA of 2.01, while winning 16 games and earning 5 shutouts.

The Black Hawks would finish in last place in the American Division, finishing 10 points behind the New York Rangers for the final playoff spot, missing the playoffs for the first time in 4 years.

Season standings

Record vs. opponents

Schedule and results

Regular season

Player statistics

Scoring leaders

Goaltending

See also
 1932–33 NHL season

References

SHRP Sports
The Internet Hockey Database
National Hockey League Guide & Record Book 2007

Chicago Blackhawks seasons
Chicago
Chicago